Kurt Schuhmann (born 12 September 1948) is a German water polo player. He competed at the 1968 Summer Olympics and the 1972 Summer Olympics.

References

1948 births
Living people
German male water polo players
Olympic water polo players of West Germany
Water polo players at the 1968 Summer Olympics
Water polo players at the 1972 Summer Olympics
Sportspeople from Würzburg